Varadero Airport or Matanzas Airport may refer to:

Juan Gualberto Gómez Airport, the main airport serving Varadero
Kawama Airport, the original airport serving Varadero